Banchharamer Bagan is a 1980 Bengali drama film directed by Tapan Sinha. It stars Manoj Mitra and is adapted from his celebrated stage play Sajano Bagan. The film was critically acclaimed and is regarded as a classic to this day.

Plot
The film revolves around the struggles of lonely aged persons. An elderly man becomes a one-man army against the corrupt society. There is an old peasant's garden, which the zamindar desperately want to occupy. Despite the continuous machinations and traps put forward by the zamindar, the aged, frail peasant Bancharam, in some way or the other, continues to live in his garden, and manages to maintain it as well.

Cast
 Manoj Mitra as Bancharam
 Dipankar De as Zamindar
 Nirmal Kumar as Lawyer
 Madhabi Mukherjee as Zamindar's Wife
 Rabi Ghosh as Doctor
 Bhanu Bandopadhyay as Priest 
 Biplab Chatterjee as Hontka/Kontka
 Devika Mukherjee as Chumki
 Bhishma Guhathakurta as Gopinath

External links

References 

1980 films
Bengali-language Indian films
1980s Bengali-language films
Films directed by Tapan Sinha
Indian drama films